Nomgon is a sum (district) of Ömnögovi Province in southern Mongolia. In 2009, its population was 2,869.

It consists of 5 smaller administrative units. The distance from the center to the border of China is approximately 170 km. 
The population is about 2,800. It has a school, a hospital, a post-office, a small hotel, and a small shop. 
The temple (Sangiin Dalai) was built about 300 years ago, with some parts having been repaired and refreshed in more recent years.

There are no tourist camps in Nomgon.

References 

Districts of Ömnögovi Province